Samid Imanov (1981 – 1/2 April 2016) was an Azerbaijani officer, major of Special Forces of Azerbaijan, National Hero of Azerbaijan.

Biography 
Samid Imanov was born in 1981 in Sovetabad (nowadays Hasanabad) settlement of Neftchala District of Azerbaijan SSR. In 1998 he graduated his district's school and entered the High Military School in Baku. Imanov graduated that school in 2003.

Since August 2004 Samid Imanov served in Special Forces of Azerbaijan. In 2007 Imanov took part in military exercises in Turkey. Also Samid Imanov participated in military courses in Pakistan, Romania and Switzerland.

For a period he was the head of security of Azerbaijani Defense Minister Zakir Hasanov. But soon due to his own wish he returned to Special Forces.

In August 2014 Samid Imanov with his troops took part in Armenian–Azerbaijani clashes. In 2016 he was a participant of the Azerbaijani general staff courses as a real candidate to generals. Imanov participated in the 2015 Moscow Victory Day Parade on Red Square commemorating the 70th anniversary of the victory over Nazi Germany, participating as part of a detached special forces contingent. After the parade, he was awarded a medal by the Ministry of Defence of Russia.

Death 
On the night from 1 to 2 April 2016 Armenian–Azerbaijani clashes took place along the line of contact in Nagorno-Karabakh and surrounding territories to the south.  On 5 April, a mutual ceasefire agreement was reached. Major Samid Imanov died on the night from 3 to 4 April near Talysh village, which is a de jure part of Azerbaijan and de facto part of Nagorno-Karabakh Republic. He was wounded, but ordered his soldiers to help and take a very seriously wounded ensign away. When his soldiers returned for him they didn't find him. Imanov, not to get captured, reportedly left the field, but died of blood loss.

On 9 April Samid Imanov was buried at Martyrs' Lane in Hasanabad of Neftchala District. The Azerbaijani national flag covering the coffin was presented to his brother.
 
Samid Imanov had two children. He hadn't reportedly seen his second newborn baby.

On 19 April 2016 Azerbaijani President Ilham Aliyev signed orders on awarding honorary titles, orders and medals to a group of Azerbaijani military servicemen who "have distinguished exceptional bravery and heroism". Samid Imanov was awarded the medal of National Hero of Azerbaijan.

References 

National Heroes of Azerbaijan
1981 births
2016 deaths
21st-century Azerbaijani Land Forces personnel
Military personnel killed in action
2016 Nagorno-Karabakh clashes
People from Neftchala District